Nicolas Trigault (1577–1628) was a Jesuit, and a missionary in China. He was also known by his latinised name Nicolaus Trigautius or Trigaultius, and his Chinese name Jin Nige.

Life and work
Born in Douai (then part of the County of Flanders in the Spanish Netherlands, now part of France), he became a Jesuit in 1594. Trigault left Europe to do missionary work in Asia around 1610, eventually arriving at Nanjing, China in 1611. He was later brought by the Chinese Catholic Li Zhizao to his hometown of Hangzhou where he worked as one of the first missionaries ever to reach that city and was eventually to die there in 1628.

In late 1612, Trigault was appointed by the China Mission's Superior, Niccolo Longobardi as the China Mission's procurator (recruitment and PR representative) in Europe. He sailed from Macau on February 9, 1613, and arrived in Rome on October 11, 1614, by way of India, the Persian Gulf and Egypt. His tasks involved reporting on the mission's progress to Pope Paul V, successfully negotiating with the Jesuit Order's General Claudio Acquaviva the independence of the China Mission from the Japan Mission, and traveling around Europe to raise money and publicize the work of the Jesuit missions. Peter Paul Rubens did a portrait of Trigault on 17 January 1617, when Trigault was either in Antwerp or Brussels (at right).

It was during this trip to Europe that Trigault edited and translated (from Italian to Latin) Matteo Ricci's "China Journal", or De Christiana expeditione apud Sinas. (He, in fact, started the work aboard the ship when sailing from Macau to India). The work was published in 1615 in Augsburg; it was later translated into many European languages and widely read. The French translation, which appeared in 1616, was translated from Latin by Trigault's own nephew, David-Floris de Riquebourg-Trigault.

In April 1618, Trigault sailed from Lisbon with over 20 newly recruited Jesuit missionaries, and arrived in Macau in April 1619.

Trigault produced one of the first systems of Chinese Romanisation (based mostly on Ricci's and Pantoja's earlier work) in 1626, in his work Xiru Ermu Zi. Trigault wrote his book in Shanxi province.

Aided by a converted Chinese, he also produced the first Chinese version of Aesop's Fables (況義 "Analogy"), published in 1625.

In the 1620s, Trigault became involved in a dispute over the correct Chinese terminology for the Christian God and defended the use of the term Shangdi that had been prohibited in 1625 by the Jesuit Superior General Muzio Vitelleschi. André Palmeiro, the Society of Jesus inspector assigned the task of investigating and reporting on the circumstances of Trigault's death in 1628, on information from Trigault's confessor Lazzaro Cattaneo, stated that a mentally unstable Trigault had become deeply depressed after failing to successfully defend the use of the term, and had committed suicide.

Publications
 De Christiana expeditione apud Sinas, Nicolas Trigault and Matteo Ricci
 Xiru Ermu Zi (西儒耳目資 "Aid to the Eyes and Ears of Western Literati")

See also

 Jesuit China missions
 Immaculate Conception Cathedral of Hangzhou
 Three Pillars of Chinese Catholicism
 Francisco Varo

References

Further reading

 Liam M. Brockey, Journey to the East: The Jesuit mission to China, 1579-1724, Harvard University Press, 2007.
 C. Dehaisnes, Vie du Père Nicolas Trigault, Tournai, 1861.
 P.M. D’Elia, "Daniele Bartoli e Nicola Trigault", Rivista Storica Italiana, ser. V, III, 1938, pp. 77–92.
 G.H. Dunne, Generation of Giants, Notre Dame (Indiana), 1962, pp. 162–182.
 L. Fezzi, "Osservazioni sul De Christiana Expeditione apud Sinas Suscepta ab Societate Iesu di Nicolas Trigault", Rivista di Storia e Letteratura Religiosa 1999, pp. 541–566.
 T.N. Foss, "Nicholas Trigault, S.J. – Amanuensis or Propagandist? The Rôle of the Editor of Della entrata della Compagnia di Giesù e Christianità nella Cina", in Lo Kuang (ed.), International Symposium on Chinese-Western Cultural Interchange in Commemoration of the 400th Anniversary of the Arrival of Matteo Ricci, S.J. in China. Taipei, Taiwan, Republic of China. September 11–16, 1983, II, Taipei, 1983, pp. 1–94.
 J. Gernet, "Della Entrata della Compagnia di Giesù e Cristianità nella Cina de Matteo Ricci (1609) et les remaniements de sa traduction latine (1615)", Académie des Inscriptions & Belles Lettres. Comptes Rendus 2003, pp. 61–84.
 E. Lamalle, "La propagande du P. Nicolas Trigault en faveur des missions de Chine (1616)", Archivum Historicum Societatis Iesu IX, 1940, pp. 49–120.
 Liam M. Brockey, “The Death and Disappearance of Nicolas Trigault, S.J.,” The Journal of the Metropolitan Museum of Art, vol. 38 (2003): pp. 161–167.

External links
Bibliographical information of Xiru Ermu Zi at the Ricci 21st Century Roundtable database, supported only by 5.0 or later versions of Internet Explorer
Facsimile of Xiru Ermu Zi at Gallica

1577 births
1628 deaths
Jesuits of the Spanish Netherlands
Jesuit missionaries in China
Roman Catholic missionaries in China
Creators of writing systems
Italian–Latin translators
Flemish Jesuits
University of Douai alumni
Jesuit missionaries
Missionary linguists
17th-century translators
17th-century Latin-language writers